Success is a ghost town in Jasper County, Mississippi, United States.

Success had a post office in the early 1900s.

The Success Cemetery is extant and located at the Decider Baptist Church, northwest of the settlement.

The former settlement is now located within the Bienville National Forest.

References

Former populated places in Jasper County, Mississippi
Former populated places in Mississippi